The Television Workshop, formerly known as the Central Junior Television Workshop is a British organisation that offers training for young people in performance skills for television, film, radio and theatre. Open to anybody between the ages of seven and 21, entry is by an annual audition process which is held each spring.

History
The Central Junior Television Workshop was originally set up by Central Independent Television in 1983 to act as a casting pool for young talent in their broadcasting region in the English Midlands. The Workshop has two branches, the original one based in Nottingham and another based in Birmingham, which opened a year later in 1984.

The Workshop has been known as several different names over the past including the Central Junior TV Workshop, Carlton Junior TV Workshop, ITV Junior TV Workshop and most recently simply The Television Workshop.

Birmingham Workshop 
In late 2008, the Birmingham workshop run by their director Colin Edwards and his assistant Ross Berkeley Simpson, lost funding from ITV due to the recession and so the Birmingham branch went 'dark'. At the same time Edwards retired.
In 2009, Ross Berkeley Simpson started a new, separate group called First Act Workshops to ensure that the work continued in Birmingham. Colin Edwards helped on a consultant level. First Act Workshops trains young actors in weekly sessions from Moseley Dance Centre. 

The Nottingham branch of the Central Television Workshop still continues under the name The Television Workshop under the helm of Nic Harvey.

Alumni

Nottingham

Awards
 The Royal Television Society Midlands Award (1988)
 The British Film Institute Children's Award (1995)
 The Children's BAFTA in recognition of its outstanding development of young talent for film and television. (2006)

References

External links
The Television Workshop
First Act Workshop (Birmingham Workshop)

Youth theatre companies
Performing groups established in 1983